Jan Langedijk (27 July 1910 – 3 December 1981) was a Dutch speed skater who competed at the 1936 and 1948 Winter Olympics. In 1936 he finished 24th in the 500 m, 14th in the 1500 m, fourth in the 5000 m and sixth in the 10,000 m event. Twelve years later he placed 29th in the 500 m, 13th in the 1500 m, fifth in the 5000 m and sixth in the 10,000 m events. Domestically he won the Dutch allround titles in 1940 and 1947.

References

External links

 Speed skating 1936+1948  

1910 births
1981 deaths
People from Langedijk
Dutch male speed skaters
Olympic speed skaters of the Netherlands
Speed skaters at the 1936 Winter Olympics
Speed skaters at the 1948 Winter Olympics
Sportspeople from North Holland
20th-century Dutch people